The 2017 French Athletics Championships was the 129th edition of the national championship in outdoor track and field for France. It was held on 14–16 July at the Pierre-Delort Stadium in Marseille. A total of 38 events (divided evenly between the sexes) were contested over the three-day competition.

Results

Men

Women

References

Results
Les Championnats de France 2017 sur le site de la Fédération française d'athlétisme
Programme des championnats de France 2017 sur le site de la FFA

French Athletics Championships
French Athletics Championships
French Athletics Championships
French Athletics Championships
Sport in Marseille